The Ural Front is a 1944 Soviet war film directed by Sergey Gerasimov and starring Tamara Makarova, Viktor Dobrovolsky and Sofya Khalyutina.

The film's sets were designed by the art director Ivan Stepanov. It was distributed in the United States in 1945 by Artkino Pictures.

Plot
The picture begins in August 1941, during the Great Patriotic War. In one town of the Urals, women accompany their husbands to the war. Now they are alone and have to cope with chores by themselves. Anna, the protagonist of the film, displays strong will and organizational skills which are needed.

Industry is evacuated to the Urals, along with equipment, and people come from places where the fighting is underway or could begin soon. These people have become refugees and they need shelter. Anna takes into her house a family - a woman with children and others also follow suit.

Cast
 Tamara Makarova as Anna Sviridova  
 Viktor Dobrovolsky as Anikeyev  
 Sofya Khalyutina as Maria Gavrilovna  
 Vladimir Solovyov as Yegor Sviridov  
 Sergei Blinnikov as Prikhodko  
 Georgi Kovrov as Chernykh  
 Mark Bernes as Kozyrev 
 Pyotr Aleynikov as Kostya Korotkov  
 Vera Altayskaya as Antonina Ushakova  
 Nikolai Konovalov as Kurochkin

References

Bibliography
 Geoffrey Nowell-Smith. The Oxford History of World Cinema. Oxford University Press, 1996.

External links 
 

1944 war films
Mosfilm films
Soviet war films
1940s Russian-language films
World War II films made in wartime
Films directed by Sergei Gerasimov
Soviet black-and-white films
Soviet World War II films
Russian World War II films